This article deals with the disputed area on the borders of the Democratic Republic of the Congo and Zambia, in Luapula Province.

Origins in the 1894 treaty

Zambia's formal northern frontier boundary was legally signed in the Anglo-Belgian Treaty of 1894, long after the 1884 Berlin Conference. This showed that the triangle of land at the northwestern point of Eastern Rhodesia from Pweto to as far south as the Lunchinda River was under Northern Rhodesia even though the Belgian Congo had administered it for many years.  Belgians administered it as a matter of local convenience under a gentleman’s agreement. Much of this administration was facilitated by the Belgium missionary work in education and health, particularly the Roman Catholic Church and Greek fishermen who wanted more fishing points to supply the reported increase in demand for fish in the emerging mine town of Elizabethville (now Lubumbashi). Later, the Belgians wanted to claim this land. Over the years, during British colonial rule, District Commissioners and Provincial Commissioners were asked to provide information on the affected areas by central government authorities in Lusaka.

The real border issue for the Northern Frontier was reported to be on Lake Tanganyika's Cape Akalunga, mentioned in the treaty and described as the point of reference.  In reality, officials had found it difficult to locate this cape. British maps show the boundary meeting at Cape Pungu (Chitankwa) whilst Belgian maps of 1955 show the meeting point at Cape Kipimbi which is far south of Cape Pungu, thereby cutting deep into assumed Northern Rhodesian territory.

During the time of the Central African Federation, the Northern-Rhodesian Federal government’s Assistant Secretary Fraser, believed that there may be mineral deposits in Pweto area and therefore all the more need for the Federal Government to protect sovereignty.  Weedens Minerals & Chartered Exploration held prospecting rights in that area. These have never been challenged. There is documentation that in 1936, Belgians had asked for 180 acres (730,000 m2) of Northern Rhodesian land apparently where Belgian colonial residences were built. However, no evidence exists that Britain conceded to this request.  In 1957, A V Ellison, an official in the Ministry of Lands & Local Government reported to the Federal government of Northern Rhodesia that triangulation surveys had been made by the Anglo-Belgian Boundary Commission from 1911–1913, when eventually a de facto boundary for the northern frontier was agreed upon. That boundary clearly indicates that Pweto was the northwestern point of reference for the northern frontier.

Belgian interests

In 1931 another British/Belgian Boundary Commission was set up. A Peake/Gendarme agreement was proposed. It was suggested that a meandering line following the watershed and thalwegs of the streams replace the straight line between Lake Mweru and Lake Tanganyika. This exchange was to favour Northern Rhodesia but was consequently rejected by the Belgians. In July 1958 Thomson, District Commissioner who visited Chief Puta’s area, noted an influx of the populace from the area occupied by Belgians into Northern Rhodesia.  They were running away from compulsory agricultural measures in Pweto’s area. The fact is that these were not refugees in the sense the term is used today. They were resisting the brutal Belgium occupation, under which they had been left without British protection. Distance and cost was the simplest excuse that British authorities in Northern Rhodesia could offer for not protecting them. After all, apart from the mining companies, the British definition of its interests in Northern Rhodesia were at best ambivalent, apart from occupying a piece of real estate.

On 8 August 1958, a preparatory meeting for the Belgian government and the Federal Government of Rhodesia & Nyasaland to discuss the Northern Rhodesia/Congo boundary was convened. Present at the meeting representing Northern Rhodesian interests were:

A W Osminara – Assistant Secretary and Chair
W H H Jones – Acting Solicitor General
T W Fraser – Assistant Secretary (W)
P W W Allin – Surveyor General
S G Burlock – Acting Land Commissioner
M S Wagner – Assistant Secretary (R)
J C L Durrant – Acting Assistant Secretary (N)
G Howe – Administrative Officer
F N N Parry – Federal Government representative
M S Benoy – 	

Belgium interests in the north appeared to be fishing and hunting in the Lake Mweru region, and possession of Kilwa Island. A joint Mweru-Luapula fisheries agreement was made between Northern Rhodesia and Belgium Congo with regards to:

 Type of nets used
 Fishing rights
 Off-season responsibilities

At this meeting, maps and plans of the areas concerned were discussed. Northern Rhodesia needed the Pedicle Road that connects Luapula Province to the Copperbelt.  (The Pedicle is a wedge of Congolese territory that cuts deep into Zambia to give the country its distinctive butterfly shape.) Belgians were not interested in the road, but were using it as a bargaining tool for other border issues. The Federal Government initially wanted to put a railway through to Luapula as suggested by the Mufulira Copper Mines Ltd.  To build a railway, however, meant the land had to be under Federal government control.  Parry also saw the advantage of linking the Rhodesian railway system with that of the Congo.  At this point in the colonial period, the rights of native inhabitants were considered insignificant and not worthy of consultation.

While the Federal Government wanted control over the pedicle, the Belgians wanted to swop territory in their favour.  The meeting decided to propose the following:

 The Northern Rhodesia government would exchange land on the northwest boundary in the Lubemba area for some of the Mokambo land held by the Belgians. This could have conceded Pweto to Congo.

However, no such swap actually took place in any formal treaty. The Mokambo pedicle remained Belgium Congo territory and yet they still occupied the northern frontier. In effect, a de facto occupation continued without their making any concession.

In the same year, 1958, D F Smith, District Assistant and a team of 11 Africans (2 of whom claimed to know where Cape Akalunga was) visited Mporokoso area to

 Find out the populace
 Find Cape Akalunga

He visited 11 villages.  He met with Chief Mulilo who told him Cape Akalunga was near Chisenga River and had once been called Mutunga village.  It had been under Congolese rule.

18 November 1958

Notes on the Northern Frontier, from the Assistant Secretary to the Executive Council.

a) Belgians concern: Kilwa island, fishing and hunting rights in Lake Mweru area

b) British concern: Nkana trespass, Mokambo strip.

The Assistant Secretary felt that Northern Rhodesia had bargaining power with the northern frontier (the Mpweto line), which the Belgians were keen on.  He proposed that the Anglo-Belgian Fisheries Advisory Board meet regularly to resolve each territory's fishing rights, to agree on African fishing methods, to agree that the Europeans buy the fish caught by the Africans (Greeks at Mpweto had in the past been doing large scale fishing and refused to buy excess fish from the Africans), to check legislation, and to look into the issue of Belgian Congo's desire to hunt crocodiles. The Assistant Secretary noted that the Belgians were uncooperative.

22 December 1958

British Consulate General in Leopoldville wrote to the Federal Government Minister of External Affairs in Salisbury.  He noted that as the frontier between Rhodesia and the Belgian Congo was situated in Lake Mweru and on the thalweg of the Luapula in a part of its course, it was appropriate for each of the riparian states to exercise their sovereign rights in the waters falling respectively under their jurisdiction.

The maps showed the frontier deviating from the centre of the lake and passing to the west of Kilwa Island which, the Belgians said, was a peninsula attached to Belgian territory.

In the same year, 1958, Mr Bowles visited Brussels and discussed the border issues with M. Grosjean, Inspector General in the Ministry of Foreign Affairs. No detailed records are available on this meeting, save to note that the frantic efforts between the British and Belgian authorities were taking place precisely at the time when the struggle for independence of the two states, particularly Congo, were getting intense. Congo gained independence in 1960; Northern Rhodesia got it four years later. In 1958 the British settlers were holding on to the territory and were keen to ensure that no land that they claimed to be theirs was surrendered to natives in the Congo.

20 March 1961

Staff Sgt G F Tredwell, Provincial Commissioner for Northern province wrote that Cape Akalunga was north of the Libondwe River and a little south of the Chisenga stream.  It was 2 miles in-shore from Lake Tanganyika.  It has a valley where Headman Mutunga had a village many years ago, and it is believed that Chief Moliro had his headquarters there too.  It was under Belgian administration.

17 April 1961

Provincial Commissioner E L Button had, in response to a query about the boundary between Lake Mweru and Lake Tanganyika, commented thus: "Despite the rather nebulous nature of a common boundary, no administrative difficulties had been caused by it, and as such it would be better to let sleeping dogs lie." Nothing in diplomacy could be as irresponsible as this statement on the question of sovereignty over land, as the case of the submerging Kasikili/Sedudu island issue between Namibia and Botswana in recent years shows. In other words, this Briton was now quite happy to concede Zambian territory to the Congo as a matter of convenience when that was not the case when the British or their proxies were ruling the territory.

29 April 1961

Acting Administrative Secretary wrote to the Governor of Northern Rhodesia.  He informed the Governor that there were 4 enclaves that were under the Belgian administration, Mpweto- Lunchinda included. The residents were forced to carry Congolese identity cards and been fully subjected to Belgian rule.  Chiefs who were living within the sphere of Belgian control provided tribal control.

February 1965

There was a border incident on Luapula River, the details of which were not fully recorded. Since both Congo and Zambia had now gained independence, this incident was between two new republics dealing with an issue left over from the colonial period.

30 April 1965

Education Minister John Mwanakatwe and Alex Shapi visited Mweru constituency.  They were held at gunpoint and manhandled by the Congolese (Katangese) gendarmes after crossing the Lunchinda River at Chipungu.  Despite explaining who they were, they were accused of being in Congolese territory.  It was not until the following day that a senior Congolese official who spoke Chibemba saved them and apologised for their mistreatment. They crossed the Lunchinda in the knowledge that they were still in Zambian territory, as the maps showed.  At this time, there was no clinic at Chipungu, so many Zambians sought medical facilities from the Congolese hospital at Mpweto. Even the Belgium Congolese franc was accepted currency in Chipungu area itself, as it was in Pweto. The fact was, Mwanakatwe was legitimately visiting his constituency, as far as the Zambian map showed.

30 September 1966

Two English geologists, Dr Premoli and Dr Bratley, and 22 Zambians were to undertake geological investigations on the coast of Lake Tanganyika between Moliro and Nsumbu bay.  They were arrested by the Congolese (Katangese) gendarme and their maps were confiscated. Congo was at war. The Zambian maps showed that this area was Zambian territory.

November 1966

In Zambia, the Permanent Secretary in the Ministry of Lands wrote to the Permanent Secretary in the Ministry of Foreign Affairs giving reference to the Mpweto/Lake Tanganyika boundary.  He pointed out that since the border was not clearly established, negotiation was necessary and suggested the setting of a Joint Boundary Commission.

The Surveyor General, D J B Copeland, in a letter dated 18 August 1966, recalled a boundary incident that had occurred in 1961.  Surveyors sent by De Beers Prospecting Ltd had an incident near Mpweto with Congolese officials. The surveyors were accused of being in Congo territory and of illegally prospecting for Congolese gold in Moba territory. This confusion was caused by the following definition of the border.

Belgian border coordinates	South latitude 8 degrees 18 minutes
British border coordinates	South latitude 8 degrees 14 minutes

The Police report showed that they had been arrested at the Chisenga River near Chipunelu.

30 September 1967

Foreign Affairs Assistant Secretary Lishomwa Muuka suggested the need for a boundary commission to discuss the dispute over:

 The Congolese claim of 8 degrees 18 minutes south
 The Zambian claim of 8 degrees 15 minutes south

He saw the need to clarify whether the point was Cape Akalunga or Cape Kipimbi.  He wrote to the British High Commissioner for information on the true boundary, but was told there was none available, despite their having been discussions on the delimitation of the boundary in 1927 and 1933 . The British, it appeared had washed their hands of the issue and were not bothered at all if the two countries went to war over a border dispute which they had themselves defended for so many years.

1968

The Congolese disputed air space and flying rights over Nippon Mining that had concession rights over Chipushi.

Summation
The border issue is a part of the history Chienge District, an area in the northern part of Zambia, on the shores of Lake Mweru.  David Livingstone visited the Lake Mweru area in 1867 during his search for the source of the Zambezi River. Following the 1889 Berlin conference and the ensuing Scramble for Africa by European powers, there was interest from Belgians, Germans and the British in Southern and Central Africa in securing the area that covered Lake Nyasa, Lake Mweru, Lake Tanganyika and Lake Victoria. In the early 1870s the Germans Reichardt and Bohn, and later in 1878, a larger group of Germans led by Wissman, visited the area around Lake Mweru. The Belgians were already looking at colonising the Congo including the area south of Lake Mweru.

Harry H. Johnston wrote in a London newspaper introducing the "Cape to Cairo" concept. He was sent by the Foreign Office to work in Southern Africa, with the African Lakes Company (ALC), which had its headquarters in Blantyre, Nyasaland (now Malawi).  Scottish missionaries who were initially interested in stopping the slave trade by Arabs, and later engaged in trading with the locals had originally set up the Company. Johnston became Commissioner of the African Lakes Company, tasked by the British government with:

 Consolidating the Protectorate of His majesty’s Government over the chiefs
 Advising the local chiefs on their external relations with the locals and foreigners
 Securing peace and order
 Ending the slave trade

The Foreign Office was unable to provide adequate funds for his administering of the area under British rule, and therefore Johnston had to turn to Cecil Rhodes, who was the Chairman of the British South Africa Company (BSAC), and struck up a working relationship with him.  He implored Rhodes to support his work by providing financial support.  This Rhodes willingly did in return for Johnston’s representing the interests of the British South Africa Company in the areas that Johnston was to administer.   Rhodes was interested in a future amalgamation with the African Lakes Company, as this would give the BSAC undisputed claim over Nyasaland.  Rhodes thus fully funded the establishment of Johnston’s administration.  Johnston played a major role in subjecting the area later to be known as North Eastern Rhodesia (NER) under British Crown rule.  Sir Johnston was also instrumental in the setting up of the first form of civil service in NER, and which was later improved by his successors Alfred Sharpe and later Robert Edward Codrington.

Based in Blantyre, Johnston was concerned about the influence of the Belgians and Germans in the Congo Free State north of Lake Mweru.  He was aware that the 2 German expeditions had visited the area in the 1870s and that both were keen to take control of the area.  In order to show British administrative authority and determination to prevent the absorption of NER by the Belgians or Germans, Sir Johnston decided to send a former hunter and now agent of the African Lakes Company, Richard Crawshay, to set up a permanent post on the shores of Lake Mweru in 1890.  Crawshay found a spot at Puta, where Chienge stream enters Lake Mweru and set up residence there.  The area north of Puta at Mpweto in the Congo Free State was under the administrative control of a Belgian named Captain Jacques.  Although the Berlin Conference had more or less divided Africa up by colonial powers, there were no distinct boundaries between Congo Free State and North Eastern Rhodesia.  As the Germans had shifted their interest to Tanganyika and Zanzibar where they had set posts, Sir Johnston therefore decided to meet with the only real threat, the Belgian administrator Captain Jacques, and together they agreed on a boundary that would be a line running from the northern tip end of Lake Mweru where the Lualaba leaves Lake Mweru to Cape Akalunga on Lake Tanganyika.  This understanding while respected by the establishment of Chienge post, it was not formalised until four years later. The formal agreements on the boundary between the Congo Free State under King Leopold of Belgium and the British Crown of King George represented by Sir Johnston through the African Lakes Company was finalised and signed on 12 May 1894.

Having secured the British post, and boundary, Sir Johnston chose to change the name of Puta and instead called Puta station Rhodesia, after his colleague and financial mentor Cecil Rhodes, also making it the first place historically to bear that name.  Crawshay stayed at Rhodesia from 1890 to 1891 when he abandoned the station and returned to Blantyre in Nyasaland.

The peoples living under the administrative control of the Africa Lakes Company in the Lake Mweru region included the Ba Bwile or Ba Ansa under Chiefs Mpweto, Puta, Kalembwe, and Mwabu. Their neighbours to the west were the Shila under Chief Mununga, Nkula and Nshimba, there were to the South the Swahili and the Tabwa under Nsama and Katele.  There were also regular visits from the Arabs of the east coast of Africa who were involved in trading in guns, gunpowder, and slaves.   For the African Lakes Company, the most important posts were Abercorn on the shores of Lake Tanganyika and Rhodesia on Lake Mweru’s shores, but of similar importance were Sumbu and Kaputa.  The people of Kaputa specialized in salt making and bought food from more fertile areas.  Johnston was concerned that Crawshay had left the Rhodesia station hastily, and asked Cecil Rhodes to fund a special tour of the area by his second in command to assess the situation there.   Cecil Rhodes obliged and Alfred Sharpe, Johnston’s second in command undertook a tour of the area.

When Alfred Sharpe toured the major posts in the Lake Mweru region including Rhodesia (Puta post) and Kaputa, he found that Abdullah bin Suleiman, (known by locals as Selemani) a Swahili chief who lived 60 miles from Kalungwishi, had driven out the people there and was demanding salt tribute from other villages. There was also evidence of slave traders harassing the inhabitants mercilessly.   On his return to Blantyre, Sharpe gave a detailed report to Johnston. Sir Johnston decided to reopen the station and sent 2 agents, Kidd and Bainbridge to take control of Rhodesia and continue to show British administrative authority.  However, Kidd and Bainbridge did not go to Rhodesia, but instead built a new post at Kafulwe some twenty kilometres from the Puta post on the shores of the Kalungwishi river where it crossed the old road to Kazembe, some 3 miles east off Lake Mweru.  They decided to adopt the name of Rhodesia for this post as well, seeing as the old post had been abandoned.  Kidd and Bainbridge remained at their new post until 1894 when they both died.  It was rumoured that they were poisoned.  The local people during this time were given protection by the collector at Rhodesia against the Arabs. Mkula, also known as Nsama after his father, and 4 African soldiers were recruited to assist the collector.

In 1896, Hubert T. Harrington, locally known as Chiana, was given charge over Mweru district.  He was transferred where Dr Blair Watson was in charge as collector.  Harrington described Kalungwishi as a strongly built Boma with four bastions.  Beneath its flagstones were buried Kidd and Bainbridge. He built a barge called the Scotia or Mandala boat, which was written off in 1919 and abandoned at Chienge in 1922.  The boat used to travel between Chienge and Kilwa Island.  There is oral evidence that Hube Harrington was a relation of the famous Harrington family that settled in the Western province of Zambia and are accredited with the skills of building the first Nalikwanda, the boat of the Litunga of the Balozi.   In 1899, Nasoro bin Suleiman, nicknamed Chisesa and a cousin to Abdullah bin Suleiman, was harassing the Ba Bwile and Shila peoples.   Harrington arrested Abdullah bin Suleiman and kept him in Kalungwishi prison.

The Rhodesia station was closed after the death of Kidd and Bainbridge and was not reopened until 1907, possibly due to lack of staff.  The station was returned to its original post at Puta, Chienge as a Boma.  The collectors who reopened this Boma were J. F. Sealy and GT Wenham and they stayed there for the next 3 years.  In 1908 the station was temporarily closed due to tsetse flies.  In 1909 - 10, Dr JD Brunton, Mr WH Jollyman were sent by Alfred Sharpe to Chienge to help with the sleeping sickness campaign.

The following are the administrators that manned the Chienge Boma thereafter:

1910	S Hillier
1912	G H Jones
1917	PCJ Reardon and wife (January) Reardon went mad and ended up in an asylum.
1917	VR Anley and wife (August)
1918	ACJ Elworthy (October)
1919	S Hillier (December)
1920	Matthews (March)
1920	CP Oldfield (September)
1922	Wickins and wife (April)
In November 1922, the station was closed due to lack of funds.
In April 1925 G H Morton reopened the station

1926	FO Hoare (December)
1927	G H Morton (October) He went mad and was sent to Cape Town asylum
1929	FO Hoare (January)
1929	March, Hoare contracted black water fever and died at Kafulwe on his way to Kawambwa.
1929	JB Thomson (June)
1930	SL Langford (January)
1932	EGF Thomson (March)
1932	SL Langford (September)
In 1933, the Chienge station was closed for lack of staff and funds and the lake Mweru region was amalgamated with Mporokoso.

In 1941, the African Lakes Company surveyed 2010 acres (8 km2) of land in Chienge. The ALC had a farm at Chienge where it was said that there were traces of copper.  The district was geologically surveyed by Luangwa concessions, a mining company but they retained no claims and no mines were opened.

Two Seventh Day Adventists Ellingworth and Lewis, missionaries from Chimpempe, visited Ponde mission, which was established in 1933 originally at Kalembwe.  They drowned in Lake Mweru and were buried at Ponde on 31 August 1952.

Chienge was after 1933 administered from Mporokoso, later from Kawambwa and in the 1970s, Nchelenge.  The current Senior Chief Puta (Kasoma) was christened as Hillier after the administrator Mr S Hillier.  Senior Chief Puta Kasoma was born in 1910 and installed as Chief Puta in 1937 after the death of Puta Mulolwa.

Chienge was re-established as a sub-Boma in 1973 under the Kaunda UNIP government’s administration.

Before the end of the first term of President Frederick J.T. Chiluba’s MMD government, a quiet but effective lobby for Chienge to become a full district was mounted Dr Katele Kalumba a nominated member of Parliament and Deputy Minister of Health from November 1991 to May 1996 and full Cabinet Minister of Health thereafter, paid off.  Dr Kalumba motives were clear.  He had an eye, since joining government, on standing as a Parliamentary candidate for Chienge.  A Circular No.  25/96 issued by the Permanent Secretary of the Ministry of Local government and Housing dated 30 October 1996 declared Chienge a new district council pursuant to Section 3 of the Local Government Act No. 22 of 1996.  At the time, Bennie Mwiinga was a Minister of Local government and Housing.

The narrative following the 12–13 December 1996 Nchelenge Council meeting defined the new Chienge as the area ‘Starting from the mouth of Kefulwa River on the Lake Mweru, the boundary follows the Kefulwa river in a straight line up to the confluence of Kasinga stream.  The Boundary runs in a straight line in the north-easterly direction up to where it meets the Kapako stream; thence the boundary runs in the northerly direction along the stream up to where it meets the Kaputa-Nchelenge administrative boundary; thence it follows along the Kaputa-Nchelenge administrative boundary in the northerly direction up to the Zambia-Zaire international boundary; thence the boundary continues in the westerly direction from the Musungwishi river along the Kaputa-Nchelenge administrative boundary; then it runs in a straight line along the Zambia-Zaire international boundary up to the mouth of Lualaba river where it flows out of lake Mweru.  The boundary thence follows the Zambia-Zaire international boundary along the lake Mweru up to the mouth of Kefulwa River, the point of starting”.

Chienge was reborn again after 106 years of its first opening. It was inaugurated on Friday the 20 December 1996 witnessed by the newly elected Member of Parliament for Chienge and Minister of Health Dr Katele Kalumba and scores of Party and Government officials.  Sitting as a councillor of Chienge, Dr Kalumba, accompanied by the Commissioner of Town and Country Planning in the Ministry of Local Government Dr Khonje, the Director of Health Planning and Development, Mr Vincent Musowe of the Ministry of Health, and presided over by Mr T.S. Phiri, Council Secretary for Nchelenge, witnessed the election of Mr Mwanda of Senior Chief Puta’s area as the first Council Chairman of the new Chienge, while Mr Bowa from Senior Chief Mununga’s area was his Vice Chairman.

Important dates

1798		death of Dr De Lacerda in Chienge?
1890-1		Crawshay opened the First known British colonial post and left the service of British central Africa and abandoned Rhodesia (PUTA) station as it was later named.
1893		Dr Blair Watson arrived at Kalungwishi as tax Collector of Mweru District
1895		Major Forbes visited Kalungwishi
1900-3		Dr Watson was Civil Commissioner and Magistrate
1901		African Lakes Company opened 2 shops at Kalungwishi and Puta
1902		ALC opens a shop at Kazembe
1902		R Codrington visits Kalungwishi
1906		R Codrington visits Kalungwishi
1907		Judge Beaufort visits Chienge
1908		E Averay Jones opened a station at Kawambwa
1908		ALC opens a shop at Kawambwa
1908/9		Hut tax introduced
1909		Male labour taken to Kasama and Fort Roseberry for the salt industry; to Salisbury to work in the mines; to Congo Free State and Angola to work for the border commission
1911		Mweru-Luapula district created.  It included Chienge, Kawambwa and Fort Roseberry
1911		GGP Lyons was appointed District Commissioner and Magistrate of Mweru-Luapula
1911		Nsama’s line deregistered as chiefs and Mukupa’s line took over (end of the Katele wa pe Lemba rule)
1911		Mweru Marsh Game reserve established.  Natives given game licences.
1922		Chienge closed for economic reasons (lack of funds)
1928/9		Hut tax removed
1929		Luangwa concession survey
1929		Indirect rule through chiefs was introduced with the Native ordinance act
1933		Chienge amalgamated with Mporokoso district under Babemba province, later to be called northern province
1936		Native treasuries introduced
1949		Ice factory built at Mulwe village.  Aluminium boats, barge and 2 motorboats
1953/4		District Education Authority formed
1957		Chienge became part of Luapula province
1908 - 28	salt trading, tree cutting, fish and game
1908 - 32	Yearly census conducted by tribe of all males, females and children
1909 - 27	Cattle was owned by Chiefs Mukupa, Puta, Chiliata, Abdullah, Sefu, Malipenga and Mupini

 Sleeping sickness came from the Congo. Kalungwishi was abandoned because of Glossina palpalis.

Trees found in the area: mulombwa, nsaninga, mukula, mupa, mwenge.

Local names of British officers

Crawshay – Kamukwamba
Bainbridge – Pembeleni
GGP Lyons – Kalelamukoshi
HJ Harrington – Chiana
White fathers – Bapatili

Missions in Chienge

1900		London Missionary Society Mr & Mrs Purves on Mbereshi River
1901		Plymouth Brethren (Garanganze) Mr & Mrs Henderson at Johnstone falls
1902		French Fathers, Peres Blancs D’Algers, Pere Foulon & Pere Sellellas at Luali
1921		Zambezi Union Mission of Seventh Day Adventists, Mr & Mrs HJ Hurlow at Chimpempe Falls
NB. These missions are listed under Rhodesia Post (Chienge) as this was before other Bomas were established. Should not be mistaken with the current administrative structures.

Game found in Mweru area, 1908–56

Elephant, buffalo, lion, leopard, eland, sable antelope, roan antelope, hartebeest, reedbuck, warthog, bushbuck, hippo, puku, waterbuck, lechwe, sitatunga, yellow buck, duiker, impala, crocodile, jackal, hyena, klipspringer, oribi, steinbok, hunting dog.
The private game areas designated in 1956 were Chisenga Island, Mununga and Chama.

Artisans
Blacksmiths, brick makers, carpenters, canoe makers, mechanics, boat builders, sawyers

Trade
Fish, iron tools, baskets & mats, tobacco, boat building

History of Zambia
Democratic Republic of the Congo–Zambia border
Territorial disputes of Zambia